The hindgut (or epigaster) is the posterior (caudal) part of the alimentary canal. In mammals, it includes the distal one third of the transverse colon and the splenic flexure, the descending colon, sigmoid colon and up to the ano-rectal junction. In zoology, the term hindgut refers also to the cecum and ascending colon.

Structure

Blood supply
Arterial supply is by the inferior mesenteric artery, and venous drainage is to the portal venous system. Lymphatic drainage is to the chyle cistern.

Nerve supply
The hindgut is innervated via the inferior mesenteric plexus. Sympathetic innervation is from the Lumbar splanchnic nerves (L1-L2), parasympathetic innervation is from S2-S4.

Development

Additional images

See also
Hindgut fermentation

External links
 

Large intestine
Embryology of digestive system